The 2017–18 Handball-Bundesliga was the 53rd season of the Handball-Bundesliga, Germany's premier handball league and the 41st season consisting of only one league. It ran from 24 August 2017 to 3 June 2018.

SG Flensburg-Handewitt won their second title.

Teams

A total of 18 teams will be participating in this year's edition of the Bundesliga. Of these, 15 sides qualified directly from the 2016–17 season and the top three sides were directly promoted from the 2. Bundesliga: TuS Nettelstedt-Lübbecke, the champions; TV Hüttenberg, the runners-up; and the third-place finisher, TSG Friesenheim.

Standings

Results

Top goalscorers

References

External links
Official website 

Handball-Bundesliga
2017–18 domestic handball leagues
2017 in German sport
2018 in German sport